Bowen Island (originally Nex̱wlélex̱m in Sḵwx̱wú7mesh), British Columbia, is an island municipality that is part of Metro Vancouver. Bowen Island is within the jurisdiction of the Islands Trust. There is regular ferry service from Horseshoe Bay provided by BC Ferries, as well as semi-regular water taxi services. The population of 4,256 is supplemented in the summer by roughly 1,500 visitors, as Bowen Island regularly receives travelers in the summer season.

History

Indigenous peoples
The name for Bowen Island is Nex̱wlélex̱m in the Squamish language of the Squamish people. The Squamish peoples used and occupied the area around Howe Sound including Bowen Island. Areas such as Snug Cove and a few other parts of the island were used as campsites for hunting and gathering trips.

Historically they would use the warmer spring and summer months to travel to resource gathering sites and move from their permanent winter villages.  Bowen Island has a traditional name in the Squamish language, Xwlíl’xhwm, translating to "Fast Drumming Ground", although some authors attribute the name to the sound made by the ocean as it passes through the tiny pass between the island's northern point and Finisterre Island. The tide rushing in and out is reminiscent of the sound of drums beating quickly. The name "Kwém̓shem" is used for Hood Point. Bowen is still used by people from Squamish and Musqueam for deer hunting.

Into the 20th century Bowen Island was actively used by Squamish people for deer and duck hunting, fishing and, later, wage jobs. In conversations with Vancouver archivist Major Matthews in the 1950s, August Jack Khatsahlano recalled knowing several Squamish who worked for whalers on the island at the turn of the 20th century.

Post-colonization
When Spanish explorers arrived on the west coast of Canada, they named many of the features of what is now the Strait of Georgia. Bowen Island was called Isla de Apodaca (after the Mexican town of Apodaca, in northeast Nuevo León state, which was itself named after a benevolent bishop, Salvador de Apodaca y Loreto) by the Spanish Captain José María Narváez in July, 1791. In 1860 Cpt. George Henry Richards renamed the island after Rear Admiral James Bowen, master of HMS Queen Charlotte. In 1871, homesteaders began to build houses and started a brickworks, which supplied bricks to the expanding city of Vancouver. Over the years, local industry has included an explosives factory, logging, mining, and milling, but there is no heavy industry on the island at present.

20th century
In the first half of the 20th century, life on Bowen was dominated by a resort operated by the Terminal Steamship Company (1900-1920) and the Union Steamship Company (1920 - 1962). These companies provided steamer service to Vancouver, and the Horseshoe Bay - Bowen Island Ferry began in 1921. When the Union Steamship resort closed in the 1960s the island returned to a quiet period of slow growth. In the 1940s and 1950s, the artists' colony called Lieben was a retreat for many famous Canadian authors, artists, and intellectuals including Earle Birney, Alice Munro, Dorothy Livesay, Margaret Laurence, A.J.M. Smith, Jack Shadbolt, Eric Nicol and Malcolm Lowry, who finished his last book, October Ferry to Gabriola, there. In the 1980s, real estate pressures in Vancouver accelerated growth on Bowen and currently the local economy is largely dependent on commuters who work on the mainland in Greater Vancouver. Prior to becoming a municipality, Bowen Island was part of the Sunshine Coast Regional District, made up of small communities and municipalities.

Commerce

Bowen Island is served by a number of small businesses including marinas, cafes, gift shops, grocery stores, a post office, pharmacy, restaurants, garden and flower shops, and a building supply yard. Bowen Island is served by First Credit Union, and by an Exchange Network ATM operated by North Shore Credit Union. Bowen Island's commercial sector is primarily located within Snug Cove and Artisan Square. It is also served by a weekly newspaper, the Bowen Island Undercurrent.

Transportation

Marine

Bowen Island is served by three scheduled water-transportation operators:
 BC Ferries, a de facto provincial Crown corporation, offers a ferry service using the Queen of Capilano car ferry, which travels between Horseshoe Bay in West Vancouver and Snug Cove on Bowen Island.
 English Bay Launch runs a passenger-only water taxi weekday commuter service between Snug Cove and Vancouver's Coal Harbour, and on summer weekends runs a tourist service between Snug Cove and Vancouver's Granville Island. This taxi service was shut down in 2018 due to the dock they used by the Parks Board on the Vancouver side being deemed unsafe.
 Cormorant Marine runs a passenger-only water taxi service providing late-night sailings between the government docks in Horseshoe Bay and in Snug Cove. In addition, weekday commuter sailings are made between Snug Cove and Horseshoe Bay, to connect with the Bowen Express Bus from downtown Vancouver.

Land
Public roads are maintained by the Bowen Island Municipality. There are roadside walking trails in only a few places and the terrain is hilly and winding. Private vehicles are the primary form of transportation and hitchhiking is commonplace.

Bowen Island has limited bus service on these TransLink bus routes, which are timed to meet some ferry sailings:
 Route 280 Bluewater/Snug Cove
 Route 281 Eagle Cliff/Snug Cove
 Route 282 Mount Gardner/Snug Cove (weekends and holidays only)

Education

The island is in the West Vancouver School District and has one public elementary school named Bowen Island Community School. High school students living in Bowen Island (grades 8 to 12) travel to West Vancouver to attend West Vancouver Secondary School, Sentinel Secondary School, or Rockridge. There is also the Island Pacific School, an International Baccalaureate middle school for grades 6 through 9. Some students also travel to West Vancouver to attend French Immersion at École Pauline Johnson. There is a public-supported home learning program, The Learning Centre, and a growing number of families also unschool. Bowen Island houses a public library in the heritage Old General Store that is also part of British Columbia's InterLink co-operative of public libraries.

Places of worship
There are a number of Christian churches on the Island. St Gerard's Catholic Church is located on Miller Road. The United Church is situated in a timber building erected in 1932 a little further along on the same road. Also on Miller Road, nearer to Snug Cove, and meeting in Bowen Court, is Bowen Island Community Church, an affiliate of the Congregational Christian Churches in Canada. Lastly, Cates Hill Chapel is a Christian Brethren church founded in 1991. Its present building on Carter Road was opened in 1999. There are also regular meetings held by Unitarians and Quakers. Bowen Island is home to the Canadian branch of L'Abri, a communal Christian retreat centre where visitors come for self-directed study. Finally, Camp Bow-Isle is a summer camp for Christian Scientists.

There are regular Buddhist meditation sittings in both the Zen and Vipassana traditions.

Bowen's Jewish community celebrates Shabbat and high holidays, and acquired a Torah in 2006.

Demographics

Ethnicity

Religion 
According to the 2021 census, religious groups in Bowen Island included:
Irreligion (2,885 persons or 68.3%)
Christianity (1,185 persons or 28.0%)
Buddhism (65 persons or 1.5%)
Judaism (60 persons or 1.4%)
Other (20 persons or 0.5%)

Films and TV series shot entirely or partly on Bowen Island 
The Trap (1966)
The Food of the Gods (1976)
Clan of the Cave Bear (1986)
People Across the Lake (1988)
American Gothic (1988)
Cousins (1989)
Look Who's Talking (1989)
Bird on a Wire (1990)
The Russia House (1990)
Another Stakeout (1993)
Intersection (1994)
Hideaway (1995)
All the Winters That Have Been (1997)
Disturbing Behavior (1998)
Double Jeopardy (1999)
Antitrust (2001)
Rugged Rich and the Ona Ona (2004)
The Fog (2005)
Paper Moon Affair (2005)
The Hitchhiker (2006)
The Wicker Man (2006)
Are We Still the Ugly American? (2008)
River (2008)
The Uninvited (2009)
Harper's Island (2009)
Virgin River (2019)

Notes

References

Further reading 

Hanen, Edythe Anstey (2004). Bowen Island Reflections. Bowen Island Historians, 160 pp.
Howard, Irene (1973). Bowen Island 1872-1972. Bowen Island Historians, 190 pp.
Ommundsen, Peter D. (1997). Bowen Island Passenger Ferries. The Sannie Transportation Company 1921-1956. Cape West Publishing, 64 pp.

External links 

 
Populated places in Greater Vancouver
Island municipalities in British Columbia
Islands of British Columbia
South Coast of British Columbia
1999 establishments in British Columbia